Glenelg was an electoral district of the Legislative Assembly in the Australian state of Victoria based in far south-western Victoria from 1904 to 1927.

It was created after the Electoral district of Normanby was abolished by the Victorian Electoral Districts Boundaries Act 1903.

Members for Glenelg

After Glenelg was abolished in 1927, a new district, the Electoral district of Port Fairy and Glenelg was created. Ernest Bond, the last member for Glenelg, represented the new district of Port Fairy and Glenelg from 1927 to 1943.

Election results

References

Former electoral districts of Victoria (Australia)
1904 establishments in Australia
1927 disestablishments in Australia